Hans Christian Andersen (1805–1875) was a Danish author and poet.

Hans Christian Andersen  may also refer to:


Places
 Hans Christian Andersen Airport, small airport servicing the Danish city of Odense
 Instituto Hans Christian Andersen,  Chilean high school located in San Fernando, Colchagua Province, Chile
 Hans Christian Andersen Museum, series of museums/houses in Odense, Denmark

Art, entertainment, and media
 Hans Christian Andersen (film), a 1952 musical film starring Danny Kaye
 The World of Hans Christian Andersen (1968), a Japanese anime fantasy film from Toei Doga, based on the works of Danish author Hans Christian Andersen
 Hans Christian Andersen (album), a 1994 album by Franciscus Henri
 Hans Christian Andersen: My Life as a Fairytale (2001), a television mini-series that fictionalizes the young life of Hans Christian Andersen

Awards
 Hans Christian Andersen Award, a prize awarded by the International Board on Books for Young People
 Hans Christian Andersen Literature Award, Danish literary award established in 2010

Sports
Hans Christian Andersen (equestrian) (1914-1993), Danish Olympic equestrian
Hans Christian Andersen Marathon, a marathon in Odense, Denmark, established in 2000